Gaelscoil Chill Dara (GSCD) is a coeducational Irish language primary school situated on the Green Road in the Curragh, County Kildare in Ireland. 

The school was founded in 1995 with the vision of delivering primary education through the medium of Irish (a Gaelscoil) while following the standard national school curriculum, allowing pupils to gain full proficiency as Gaeilge. Gaelscoil Chill Dara was originally based in Herbert Lodge on the Curragh, moving to a much larger purpose-built premises at Curragh Grange in the early millennium due to the increasing demanding for primary Irish-speaking education in the Co. Kildare region. The school serves the surrounding urban centres of Newbridge, Kildare Town, Naas, Kilcullen and Rathangan.

Gaelscoil Chill Dara has a Catholic religious ethos and is under the patronage of An Foras Pátrúnachta na Scoileanna LánGhaeilge Teo. "Chill Dara" (singular Cill Dara) is the Irish name for Kildare, meaning "church of the oak". Pupils range in age from 4 to 13 years of age. Its main education focus is on English, Irish, Mathematics and Drama subjects.

The number of pupils enrolled in the school for the 2015/16 school year was 444, with an even breakdown in the number of girls and boys, and 16 classes spanning the 8 years from junior infants to sixth class. The school has been oversubscribed for a number of years.

The current principal is Niamh Uí Chadhla, who was appointed in 2019 after the resignation of former principal Seán de Paor, who had been principal since the school's establishment in 1995.

See also
 Gaelcholáiste Chill Dara, an Irish-medium secondary school located nearby in Naas

References

1995 establishments in Ireland
Roman Catholic schools in the Republic of Ireland
Educational institutions established in 1995
Gaelscoil
Irish-language schools and college
Primary schools in County Kildare